Alexander Zverev defeated Roger Federer in the final, 6–3, 6–4 to win the men's singles tennis title at the 2017 Canadian Open. Zverev saved three match points en route to the title, in his second-round match against Richard Gasquet.

Novak Djokovic was the reigning champion, but did not participate due to an elbow injury.

As a result of Andy Murray's withdrawal due to a hip injury, Rafael Nadal had a chance to regain the ATP no. 1 singles ranking for the first time since 2014 by reaching the semifinals; however, he lost in the third round to Denis Shapovalov.

Seeds
The top eight seeds received a bye into the second round.

Draw

Finals

Top half

Section 1

Section 2

Bottom half

Section 3

Section 4

Qualifying

Seeds

Qualifiers

Lucky losers

Qualifying draw

First qualifier

Second qualifier

Third qualifier

Fourth qualifier

Fifth qualifier

Sixth qualifier

Seventh qualifier

References

External links
Main Draw
Qualifying Draw

Men's Singles